Margaret Noble (born 1972) is an American conceptual artist, sound artist, installation artist, teacher and electronic music composer.

Early life and education
The daughter of artist Jill Hosmer, Noble was born in Waco, Texas, and grew up in the City Heights neighborhood of San Diego, moving there in 1982 at the age of 9. Her youth in City Heights has been described as "dependent on welfare, captivated by hip-hop and dance music, among racially diverse neighbors." She earned a BA in philosophy from the University of California at San Diego in 2002, and an MFA in sound art at the School of the Art Institute of Chicago in 2007.

Career
As a house music disc jockey, Noble performed at underground clubs internationally and in Chicago, Illinois, where she spent five years as a DJ. In 2007, she moved to San Diego to teach media production at High Tech High School in Point Loma while continuing her sound art practice.

She collaborated in 2011 with math teacher David Stahnke in the "Illuminated Mathematics" project, winning second place in knowledge building and critical thinking, among twelve educators who represented the U.S. at Microsoft's Global Learning Forum. They went on to win first place in "Knowledge Building and Critical Thinking" category of the Global Forum Educator Awards.

Frakture (2009-10)
Noble's Frakture, a remix of a 1953 vinyl recording of George Orwell's novel Nineteen Eighty-Four, is an "eight-track audio collage of analog synthesizer, acoustic drums, recordings of healthcare protests, contemporary political propaganda, emergency alarms, the New York Stock Exchange, dice rolling" and other sounds. On the recording, Noble reads excerpts from the text of the novel.

Sound art and installations (2012-present)

Noble's installation 44th and Landis opened in 2012 at the Museum of Contemporary Art San Diego. The large-scale multimedia art piece combined Victorian-style paper dolls with 1980s urban influences based on her upbringing in San Diego's City Heights neighborhood, and included a performance by Noble. The show's visual centerpiece was a hanging series of 100 paper dolls, along with paper-doll clothing, objects and architecture. 
In her 2016 interactive piece "What Lies Beneath", she worked in sound sculpture, creating a tall wooden box with instructions next to it to raise the lid, which caused sounds of organ pipes, truck brakes and other dissonance to emit. The person interacting with it controlled the sound with the lid, with a "storm" inside the box.

Her "Head in the Sand" is a wooden box sitting on four legs with a head-sized hole in the top and instructions to visitors to place their heads in the hole and wait. Inside is a chambered light and sound show with soft pastoral sounds, the hole serving as a sanctuary from the art exhibit itself. "Head in the Sand" was included in her 2016 exhibition Resonating Object, an interactive mixture of sound, sculpture and videos, at South Puget Sound Community College in Olympia, Washington. The exhibition also included "I Long to Be Free From Longing" and "Material Shrine for the New Class", featuring dangling objects the visitor could squeeze to activate different sounds. Her 2014 interactive sound installation "I Long to Be Free From Longing" won first place in the 23rd annual Juried Exhibition at the Athenaeum Music & Arts Library in San Diego.

Noble's 2016 sound art installation Time Strata, a public art commission for the Port of San Diego at the Cesar Chavez Park pier, consisted of three sound sculptures made of materials including vintage buoys, hunks of bamboo, bells, stainless steel and harp strings, along with sounds of creatures like snapping shrimp in the water under the pier. Microphones placed around the pier fed the sound into a mixer and then into four digital consoles where participants could sample and alter the sounds.

For The Collector, Noble worked with puppeteers Animal Cracker Conspiracy and visual directors Bridget Rountree and Iain Gunn, creating a multi-layered soundscape that used animated video, live video projection and puppetry to tell a story of a debt collector. Righteous Exploits, a 2013 experimental performance created with Justin Hudnall, used a combination of live audio and video multimedia and performance art.

Her 2018 installations of Resonating Objects included "lawn sprinklers sitting on grass-covered pedestals, playing their percussive, shimmering, water-spraying sounds", entitled "I Have Arrived", which explores the use of expendable resources on lawns, or status symbols.

Two other pieces are "Scaled Discords, 2015", with spinning tops representing "power structures, resource allocation and racial inequality in America", and "A Shit Pile of Lights and Sounds for Your Pleasure" consisting of "mash-up of Lite Brite, a Ouija board, and an early Akai sampler".

Critical reception 
Noble's art has been presented on PBS and reviewed favorably in Art Ltd. Magazine, The San Diego Union-Tribune, and San Francisco Weekly.  Thomas Larson of the San Diego Reader wrote that "enlarging the sensorium of art with sound begins with disorder," but while visual art may be viewed with "one or one hundred other hushed-up viewers," sound art is more like "a Fourth-of-July picnic, Charles-Ives polyphony, a resolute disequilibrium".
Reviewing her exhibit titled, "Now Is Not A Good Time", Rebecca Romani of The Buzz wrote in 2018 of its "intriguing mix" of sewing and tatting materials and rattlesnake tails powered by tiny batteries. Romani commented, "It's tempting to read a cautionary tale of watching too much Little House On The Prairie and the nostalgia that lead us to these current times."

Reviewer Michael James Rocha said in 2016, "Artist Margaret Noble isn't afraid to push the boundaries of what's art."

Observing Frakture, Jennie Punter of Musicworks wrote of Noble's "underground club DJ’s flair for performance and a conceptual artist's commitment to the rigorous investigation of ideas". Mark Jenkins of The Washington Post wrote, "Her primary goal is audience participation, whether that involves turning a crank or inserting one's head into a box to prompt whooshing sounds. Noble's work completes its circuit when the spectator is, literally or figuratively, inside it."

Of the exhibit 44th and Landis, Angela Carone of Public Radio International commented, "Look close and you'll see the ghosts of Ms. Pac-Man, the labels from Animal Cracker boxes and Laffy Taffy, and, on the seedier side, signage from neighborhood massage parlors. The paper dolls are pint-sized mash-ups of '80s pop culture and Victoriana. They seem to emerge from Noble's childhood dreams as she tried to make sense of both a threatening and exciting environment." Drew Snyder noted, "...there is an excess to the sound collage, a soft but persistent drone of spinning bottles or coins, rolling glass marbles, the eternal creak of a cabinet hinge, the rapt knocking on a door, or the sound of something falling over. These reverberations are strikingly material, a confluence and collision of metal, plastic, wood and glass that mash up and reconfigure what we can imagine as a neighborhood's aural life."

Discography

Albums
 Frakture (2010, self-released on CD and vinyl)

Compilations
 "Nufon", from Female Pressure (2008, Austrian DVD release)
 "Safer is Better", from Musicworks #118 Spring 2014 (2014, CD)

Solo exhibitions
 44th and Landis, Museum of Contemporary Art San Diego, 2012
 Touch, Ohrenhoch der Geräuschladen Sound Gallery, Berlin, Germany, 2014
 Dorian's Gray, Roswell Museum and Art Center, Roswell, NM, 2015 
 Resonating Objects, Institute of Contemporary Art, San Jose, CA, 2015
 Interactivity: Sight and Sound, Cafritz Foundation Arts Center, Montgomery, MD, 2015
 Resonating Objects, Kenneth J. Minnaert Center for the Arts, South Puget Sound Community College, Olympia, WA, 2016
 Surrogate Daydreams, Mute Gallery, Lisbon, Portugal, 2016
 Incorporeal Things to Control, Athenaeum Music & Arts Library, San Diego, CA, 2016
 Surrogate Daydreams, LAAA Gallery 8 25, Los Angeles, CA, 2016
Resonating Objects, Monterey Peninsula College Art Department Gallery, Monterey, CA, 2018
Resonating Objects, Lewis-Clark State College Center for Arts & History, Lewiston, ID, 2018

Honors and awards
 International Government's Grant, 2007
 Hayward Prize, 2007
 University of California Alumni "Change the World" Scholarship
 Microsoft Global Educator Award for Knowledge Building
 Creative Catalyst Fellowship, 2012
 First Prize, Musicworks composition contest, for "Safer is Better", 2013
 First Place, Athenaeum Juried Exhibition, for I Long to Be Free From Longing, 2014

Selected sound art installations

References

External links 

, video, (3:12)
, video (7:01)
, video (5:06)
, video (4:42)
, video (4:01)
, video (1:41)

1972 births
American conceptual artists
American sound artists
Women sound artists
Artists from Texas
Artists from San Diego
Living people
Educators from Texas
Educators from California
American women educators
American DJs
Women DJs
21st-century American women musicians